Rodney Colin Williams (born April 25, 1977) is an American former gridiron football punter.

College career
Williams, who played from 1995 to 1998, left Georgia Tech as the school's career leader in punting average at 41.1 yards a kick. His single-season average of 45.64 yards per punt in 1997 set a school record that stood until Pressley Harvin III broke it in 2020 with an average of 48.0 yards per punt. That same season, he had a school record 553 punting yards against Florida State. In November 2011, Williams was inducted into the Georgia Tech Sports Hall of Fame.

Professional career
Drafted out of Georgia Tech by the St. Louis Rams. Williams played 2 seasons in NFL Europe where he was a Special Teams Captain for the 2000 World Bowl Champions, Rhine Fire. In 2001 landing a job with the New York Giants. At the time, Williams was the only African-American punter in the NFL, and was just the fourth in the league's history. Williams set a team record with a 90-yard punt on Monday Night Football on September 10, 2001 in Denver against the Broncos,  a record that stands to date. Williams officially retired from the NFL in 2007.

References

External links
nfl.com profile

1977 births
Living people
American football punters
Canadian football punters
Edmonton Elks players
Georgia Tech Yellow Jackets football players
New York Giants players
People from Decatur, Georgia
Sportspeople from DeKalb County, Georgia